The Valea Roșie is a left tributary of the river Petriș in Romania. It flows into the Petriș in the village Petriș.

References

Rivers of Romania
Rivers of Arad County